Luno may refer to:

 "Luno" (song), a song on Bloc Party's 2005 album Silent Alarm
 Luno the White Stallion, a Terrytoons television series 
 LUNO (band), a Czechoslovakian band 
 Loyola University New Orleans, a university in New Orleans
 Bianco Luno (1795-1852), Danish entrepreneur